Tino Villanueva (born December 11, 1941, San Marcos, Texas) is an American poet and writer.  His early work was associated with the Chicano literary renaissance of the 1960s and 1970s, and Villanueva is considered to be a primary figure in that literary movement.  More recently, Villanueva's work has treated themes from Greek mythology.

Life
In 1963, Villanueva was drafted into the United States Army, and spent two years in the Panama Canal Zone, where he became immersed in Hispanic literature, reading Rubén Darío and José Martí.  He graduated from Texas State University, on the G.I. Bill, from the State University of New York at Buffalo with an M.A. in 1971, and from Boston University with a doctorate in Spanish in 1981. He has taught at Wellesley College, and held visiting appointments at the University of Texas-Austin, the College of William and Mary, and Bowdoin College.  Until his retirement in 2015, Villanueva served as senior lecturer in Spanish, Department of Romance Studies in the College of Arts and Sciences at Boston University.

Villanueva writes in both English and Spanish, often switching between the two languages. 
He founded Imagine Publishers, Inc., and edited Imagine: International Chicano Poetry Journal.

His papers are held at Texas State University.

Awards
 1994 American Book Award, for Scenes from the Movie GIANT (1993).
 1995 Distinguished Alumnus Award from Texas State University-San Marcos.
2015 Liberal Arts Distinguished Alumni Achievement Award, Texas State University-San Marcos.

Works
  (There Is Another Voice Poems) 1972
 
 
 

So Spoke Penelope.  Grolier Poetry Press.  2013.  .

References

External links
"Spanish Poetry", Library of Congress, 09/22/2006
"Poet Tino Villanueva to read at The Somerville News Writers Festival Nov. 14, 2009", Boston Area Small Press, Doug Holder, September 06, 2009

1941 births
Living people
American male poets
Texas State University alumni
University at Buffalo alumni
Boston University alumni
Wellesley College faculty
Boston University faculty
American Book Award winners
People from San Marcos, Texas